Bifidobacterium tsurumiense is a Gram-positive, rod-shaped species of bacteria. Strains of this species were originally isolated from dental plaques from golden hamsters.

References

External links
Type strain of Bifidobacterium tsurumiense at BacDive -  the Bacterial Diversity Metadatabase

Bacteria described in 2008
Bifidobacteriales